The women's shot put at the 2004 Summer Olympics in Athens was held on 18 August 2004 at the Ancient Olympia Stadium. It was originally planned to hold the discus throw at this venue, but it was discovered that the field was not large enough to accommodate the range of modern discus throwers, and would have posed a danger to spectators. As such, it was decided instead to hold the shot put at the site, despite the fact that the shot put was not contested at the Ancient Olympic Games. All distances are given in metres.

On 23 August 2004, Irina Korzhanenko of Russia was stripped of her gold medal and received a lifetime ban by the International Olympic Committee (as it was her second doping offense after 1999) after she tested positive for the steroid stanozolol. Accordingly, Cuba's Yumileidi Cumbá, Germany's Nadine Kleinert, and Korzhanenko's teammate Svetlana Krivelyova were upgraded to the medal positions. On 5 December 2012, eight years after the official medal ceremony, Krivelyova was disqualified and stripped of her bronze medal after a re-analysis of her 2004 sample tested positive for oxandrolone; as the next two finishers Nadzeya Astapchuk and Natallia Kharaneka had both been banned for doping offenses since 2004, the IOC decided to declare the medal vacant.

Competition format
Each athlete receives three throws in the qualifying round. All who achieve the qualifying distance progress to the final. If less than twelve athletes achieve this mark, then the twelve furthest throwing athletes reach the final. Each finalist is allowed three throws in last round, with the top eight athletes after that point being given three further attempts.

Schedule
All times are Greece Standard Time (UTC+2)

Records
, the existing World and Olympic records were as follows.

No new records were set during the competition.

Results

Qualifying round
Rule: Qualifying standard 18.50 (Q) or at least 12 best qualified (q).

 Olga Shchukina of Uzbekistan was disqualified after she tested positive for clenbuterol during the pre-competition screening process.

Final

References

External links
Official Olympic Report

W
Shot put at the Olympics
2004 in women's athletics
Women's events at the 2004 Summer Olympics